Tiancun Road Subdistrict is a subdistrict on the southwest of Haidian District, Beijing, China. It borders Sijiqing Town in the north, Shuguang and Balizhuang Subdistricts in the east, Yongding Road, Wanshou Road and Laoshan Subdistricts in the south, and Bajiao Subdistrict in the west. As of 2020 it had a population of 108,088.

The subdistrict was established in 2000, and was named for the Tiancun Road that passed through it.

Administrative Divisions 
In the year 2021, Tiancun Road Subdistrict covered a total of 27 communities:

See also 
 List of township-level divisions of Beijing

References 

Haidian District
Subdistricts of Beijing